Frank Macky (19 December 1891 – 29 December 1975) was an Australian rules footballer who played with the Melbourne University Football Club in the Victorian Football League (VFL).

Family
The son of Joseph Cochrane Macky (1855–1915), and Mary Macky (1858–1915), née Birrell, Frank Macky was born at Auckland, New Zealand on 19 December 1891.

Both his parents were drowned on 7 May 1915 when the British ocean liner RMS Lusitania was sunk by the German U-Boat SM U-20. Although offered a seat on a lifeboat, Mary Macky gave her seat to a younger woman, choosing to remain with her husband.

He married Barbara Allan Taylor (1916–1975), at Cambridge, New Zealand on 2 March 1916.

Football
In 1911 he played in seven matches in the VFL competition with the University First XVIII: the first, against Essendon on 27 May 1911, and the last, against Melbourne on 26 August 1911.

Education
Educated at New College, Box Hill, he studied medicine at the University of Melbourne (whilst a resident at Ormond College), and graduated Bachelor of Medicine, Bachelor of Surgery in April 1914.

Military service
He enlisted in the Royal Australian Army Medical Corps on 17 July 1915. and served overseas in the Middle East and in Europe.

Medical career
In May 1914 he applied for registration as a medical practitioner in Auckland, New Zealand.

For a number of years he was the president of the Auckland Branch of the British Medical Association.

Footnotes

Sources
 World War One Embarkation Roll: Captain Frank Macky, Collection of the Australian War Memorial.
 World War One Nominal Roll: Major Frank Macky, Collection of the Australian War Memorial.
 World War One Service Record: Major Frank Macky, National Archives of Australia.

External links

1891 births
1975 deaths
University Football Club players
VFL/AFL players born outside Australia
New Zealand players of Australian rules football
Australian military personnel of World War I